Connecticut's 36th House of Representatives district elects one member of the Connecticut House of Representatives. It consists of Haddam, Chester, Essex, and Deep River. It has been represented by Democrat Christine Palm since 2019.

Recent elections

2020

2018

2016

2014

2012

References

36